Jim Maguire was an Irish footballer who played as a full back. He was born in Dublin.

He joined Shamrock Rovers in 1927. His brother Mick also played at Glenmalure Park for the Hoops and their father William Maguire was one of the founders of Shamrock Rovers. Former Rovers Chairman Tony Maguire is his son.

He won one cap for the Irish Free State in a 4–0 friendly win over Belgium at Dalymount Park on 20 April 1929.

Honours
FAI Cup: 1
 Shamrock Rovers – 1929
Leinster Senior Cup: 1
 Shamrock Rovers – 1929

Sources 
 The Hoops by Paul Doolan and Robert Goggins

References

Association footballers from County Dublin
Republic of Ireland association footballers
Irish Free State international footballers
Shamrock Rovers F.C. players
League of Ireland players
Year of birth missing
Year of death missing
Irish Free State association footballers
Association football fullbacks